The 1936–37 season was Cardiff City F.C.'s 17th season in the Football League. They competed in the 22-team Division Three South, then the third tier of English football, finishing 18th. The team played in the FA Cup, Welsh Cup, and the Third Division South Cup, being eliminated in the 3rd round, 8th round, and 2nd round, respectively.

Season review

Football League Third Division South

Partial league table

Results by round

Players
First team squad.

Fixtures and results

Third Division South

FA Cup

Welsh Cup

Third Division South Cup

Source

References

Bibliography

Cardiff City F.C. seasons
Association football clubs 1936–37 season
Card